Edward Joe Jankowski (June 23, 1913 – July 20, 1996) was an American football player. He played running back for five seasons for the Green Bay Packers.  He was inducted into the Green Bay Packers Hall of Fame in 1984.  He played college football at the University of Wisconsin, where he was a member of the Sigma Nu fraternity. Following his playing career, Jankowski was an officer in the United States Navy during World War II before working for Miller Brewing Company and becoming a coach at Whitefish Bay High School.

References

External links
 

1913 births
1996 deaths
American football fullbacks
Green Bay Packers players
Wisconsin Badgers football players
High school football coaches in Wisconsin
United States Navy personnel of World War II
United States Navy officers
Coaches of American football from Wisconsin
Players of American football from Milwaukee
Military personnel from Milwaukee